The Škoda 130, Škoda 135 and Škoda 136 are three variations of a rear-engined, rear-wheel drive small family car that was produced by Czechoslovakian car manufacturer AZNP in Mladá Boleslav, Czechoslovakia between 1984 and 1990. The Škoda 130 is known internally as Type 742, and the Škoda 135/136 as Type 746. They were developed from the Škoda 105/120 series.

Introduction

The very first Škoda 130 models were introduced in August 1984, shortly after the earlier Škoda 105/120 models were given a mild revamp. Developed from the earlier Škoda 105/120 models (some of which continued in production alongside the Škoda 130 models), the 130 series used a new 1289 cc engine (which produced , and which was just an enlarged version of the 1174 cc engine used in the 120 series).  The 130/135/136 series also had a five-speed gearbox, semi-trailing arm rear suspension, wider track and four-pot front brake disc calipers (the latter two of which were already in use in the 105/120 series). The Saloon versions of the new 130 series were available in 130 L and 130 GL forms and the Coupè model was the 130 Rapid, which (with the exception of their mechanical specification) were broadly identical to the smaller-engined 120 LS and GLS Saloons and 120 Rapid Coupé.

Final years
The introduction of the more technically innovated Škoda 130 series might have been a reasonably great success for Škoda, but the basic engineering design dated back to the 1960s, and was therefore extremely outdated by the 1980s.

The final models to evolve from the rear-engined Škoda generation were the Škoda 135/136 series, introduced in April 1987. These new models also had a new front grille (which was also fitted to the remaining models of the 105/120 series). Inside, the only change was a new instrument panel.

The Rapid coupe versions of the 130, 135 and 136 series were renowned as being the only cars which handled like the notoriously enjoyable yet temperamental Porsche 911 of the same era.

The rear-engined Škodas continued in production until 1990, when the very last ones left the Škoda factories in Kvasiny and Mladá Boleslav.

Rally success

The 1.3 Skoda Estelle was an unlikely hero of the Rallying world in the '70s and '80s. The Škoda Motorsport works team won their class for 17 years running on the RAC Rally, and also claimed class wins on many other world and European championship rallies.  Many of the team's drivers were selected from among the company's staff, although foreign professionals did drive for Škoda as well, most notably Norwegian driver John Haugland.

Until the mid-1980s Škoda used the 120 model, before building a lightweight and more powerful car, the 130 LR, to conform to the Group B rules.  After Group B was banned, at the end of the 1986 season, the team reverted to Group A cars, and used the 130 L model until the arrival of the Favorit in 1989. It is interesting to note that a Group B 130 won its class on the 1987 RAC Rally, as the ban did not apply to 1300cc cars until the following season.

Other markets

Britain
The 130 models made their UK debut in March 1985 and were available in both Estelle 130 L and 130 LSE 4-door saloon and 130 Rapid 2-door Coupé forms, with an aftermarket Cabriolet version of the Rapid also available. The Estelle 130 GL, which was available in Eastern Europe from August 1986, arrived in the UK market in May 1987. The UK market got the 136 Rapid Coupé and Cabriolet models in August 1988, followed by the rare fuel-injected Rapid 135 RiC Coupé in December 1989. Both these, and the Estelle 120 L and 120 L Five Saloons, were discontinued just four months later. The Estelle and Rapid were very competitive cars, which helped Škoda to new sales records in Western Europe in the late 1980s (about 17,000 105/120/130 models were sold in the UK in 1987 alone).

The new 130 models silenced the earlier criticism that had been made in some quarters of tail-happy handling, with the prominent UK motoring magazine "Autocar and Motor" remarking in 1988 that the new 136 Rapid model "handles like a Porsche 911" in that the rear-engine design encouraged oversteer.

Like the smaller-engined Škoda 105/120, the Škoda 130/135/136 gradually became a rare sight on Britain's roads by the time the 21st century dawned. With just 612 of the Škoda 105/120 range still registered in the UK, it is unclear how many of the Škoda 130 series have survived. Due to their rarity in the UK, prices for good 130s are rising.

130 LSE (1985–1988) - Developed from the 130 L with the 120 LSE specification.
Rapid Cabriolet (1984–1990) - Developed from the Rapid Coupe at Ludgate Design Developments in Kent initially in Standard form only, which included a removable full-sized hood and a central rollover T-bar. The rarer Lux model available from 1987 had wind down rear quarter lights. At least 334 cabriolets were sold in Britain.

Austria/Canada/Finland
130 LX - this model was available in Finland (fitting in between the 130 L and 130 GL), with Saab seats fitted by the importer.
135 GLi - this fuel-injected four-door saloon model was available in Austria, Canada and Finland and was technically similar to the rare Rapid 135 RiC that was offered in Britain and Austria.

Poland
130 L - identical to the 130 GL.

Model by model

Škoda 130/135/136 Timeline
 August 1984: Introduction of the Škoda 130 series. Available as: 130 L 4-door Saloon (Type 742.13) and 130 Rapid 2-door Coupé (Type 743.13).
 August 1986: Introduction of the 130 GL 4-door Saloon.
 April 1987: Introduction of the Škoda 135/136 series. Available as: 135 L and 135 GL 4-door Saloons (Types 746.135), 135 Rapid 2-door Coupé (Type 747.135), 136 L and 136 GL 4-door Saloons (Type 746.136), and 136 Rapid 2-door Coupé (Type 747.136).
 July 1988: End of production of the 130 series.
 August 1990: End of production of the 135/136 series, bringing production of the rear-engined Škoda generation to a close.

Engines differences
All models in the range used a variant of the Škoda 1298 cc OHV 8V straight-four engine. The main difference between the models was the engine's cylinder head: the 130 had a 5-port cast-iron cylinder head, which couldn't use unleaded gasoline, whilst 135 engines had an aluminium 8-port cylinder head, which could use unleaded gasoline.  The 136 engine was the same as the 135's, but with a higher compression ratio for better performance.

External links
Škoda-Auto.com - official corporate website
Skoda 105/120/130 in Canada

Cars powered by rear-mounted 4-cylinder engines
0130-136
Cars introduced in 1984
Cars discontinued in 1990